Michael Kohlmann and Alexander Waske were the defending champions, but chose not to participate that year.

Paul Hanley and Jordan Kerr won in the final 6–3, 3–6, [10–8], against Christopher Kas and Rogier Wassen.

Seeds

Draw

Draw

External links
Draw

Doubles
2008 ATP Tour